The Arlington and Roslyn Place District is a historic district in Chicago, Illinois, United States.  The district was built between 1894 and 1910 by various architects. It was designated a Chicago Landmark on November 15, 1989.

References

1890s architecture in the United States
1900s architecture in the United States
Historic districts in Chicago
Chicago Landmarks